Arusha Region is one of Tanzania's 31 administrative regions and is located in the north of the country. The region's capital and largest city is the city of Arusha. The region is bordered by Kajiado County and Narok County in Kenya to the north, the Kilimanjaro Region to the east, the Manyara and Singida Regions to the south, and the Mara and Simiyu regions to the west. Arusha Region is home to Ngorongoro Conservation Area, a UNESCO World Heritage Site. The region is comparable in size to the combined land and water areas of the state of Maryland in the United States.

Arusha Region is a tourist destination in Africa and is the hub of the northern Tanzania safari circuit. The national parks and nature reserves in this region include Ngorongoro Conservation Area, Arusha National Park, the Loliondo Game Controlled Area, and part of Lake Manyara National Park. Remains of 600-year-old stone structures are found at Engaruka, just off the dirt road between Mto wa Mbu and Lake Natron. With a HDI of 0.721, Arusha is one among the most developed regions of Tanzania.

Etymology 
The "Arusha" Region is named after the Arusha People, a Bantu ethnic group that originally migrated from Arusha Chini in Kilimanjaro Region around 400 years ago.

History

Prehistory 
Arusha Region is home to Laetoli and Olduvai Gorge national archaeological sites both locations with discoveries of prehistoric hominids.

First Communities 
The first communities in southwestern Arusha Region's Arusha District, Arusha Rural District and Meru District, were the now extinct Koningo people, an ancient hunter-gatherer group that lived around the slopes of Mount Meru for centuries.

The second community to settle in the region is the Meru People, whom immigrated there from the Usambara Mountains in Tanga Region. They settled on the southeastern slopes of the mountain and started to farm the land. The third wave of settlers were the Arusha people a subgroup of the Pare people  migrated from Arusha Chini in  Kilimanjaro Region. Some Parakuyo Masai in west whom were the last group to immigrate to Arusha Region in the 1830s, assimilated into the Arusha community and influenced the Arusha into adopting the Masai language.

In 1880s a pandemic of rinderpest killed thousands of cattle and forced a large section of the Masai people in the west and integrated into Arusha agriculturally based society. In southeastern portion of the region in Karatu District  and southern Ngorongoro District is the ancestral home to the Hadzabe People, who are the only  surviving hunter gather communities left in the country.

Moreover, Most of the Ngorongoro District, Monduli District and Longido District of the present area of Arusha Region are home to the Maasai, whom immigrated from South Sudan and moved started moving southward around 16th Century CE towards Kenya and finally reached northwestern Arusha Region in the 1830s.  The Masai were the last precolonial community to settle in present-day Arusha Region.

Colonial period 
Prior to German arrival in 1895, the years between 1880s to 1900, Arusha Region was plagued by rinderpest, Smallpox, droughts and famine that came after the devastating plagues.

The first German to visit Arusha territory was Kurt Johannes, and he was antagonistic towards the Arusha people and on occasion he survived an attack that cost the lives of two German missionaries in 1895. On 19 October 1896 he went to visit Chief Matunda and was attacked by Arusha warriors. 
Johannes survived the attack and returned to his post in Moshi and organised Chagga warriors for a retaliatory attack and defeated the WaArusha on 31 October 1896.

Johannes then decided to conduct the scorched earth doctrine on the WaArusha people, leading to a famine and collapse of Arusha society. In 1899, Johannes forced the defeated Arusha warriors to build the German Boma next to today's Arusha Region Headquarters. The Arusha Region was under German military rule and in 1902, one hundred Afrikaners fleeing the Boer War in South Africa, are resettled in Arusha by German authorities, with each family given 1,000 hectares of land.

For various reasons, many of the white settlers moved to Kenyan highlands or back to South Africa in a few years before the advent of World War I. During the great war, the British capture Arusha Region from the Germans in 1916. They expelled all the Germans and confiscated their farms and redistributed the farms to Greek and British settlers.

The Meru and Arusha's Chagga wives were repatriated back to Kilimanjaro. The British start growing coffee in 1920.  The administrative region of Arusha existed in 1922 while mainland Tanzania was a British mandate under the League of Nations and known as Tanganyika. In 1948, the area was in the Northern Province, The British appoint the first WaArusha community leader Chief Simeon Laiseri in 1948.

Post-Independence period 
In 1966, under the newly independent Tanzanian government, Arusha was given its own regional status. In 2002, Manyara Region was created and was split from Arusha Region. Portions of the former Arusha Region districts of Kiteto, Babati, Mbulu, Hanang, and a tiny piece of Monduli were incorporated into the Manyara Region. Arusha was the largest region in Tanzania from 1966 to 2002.

Geography 
The Great Rift Valley runs through the middle of the region north-to-south. Oldonyo Lengai (Mountain of God in the Maasai language) is an active volcano to the north of the Ngorongoro Conservation Area.

Mountains 
Arusha Region has the highest number of craters and extinct volcanoes in Tanzania. Other prominent peaks and mountains include the Monduli Mountains, Mount Loolmalasin, Mount Lolkisale, Mount Longido, Gelai Volcano, and the Olduvai Gorge.

Lakes 
Arusha region is home to a number of lakes, the largest lake in the region being Lake Eyasi. Other prominent lakes in the region are Lake Duluti, Momela Lakes, Lake Manyara, Lake Masek, Lake Empakaai, Lake Magadi, Lake Ndutu and Lake Natron. Most of the lakes in the region are alkaline in nature.

Administrative divisions

Districts
Arusha Region is divided into one city and six districts, each administered by a council.

Notes:

* - representing the west portion of the former Arumeru District
** - representing the east portion of the former Arumeru District

National parks, national monuments, and other sites 

Arusha National Park
Empakaai Crater
Engaruka
Great Rift Valley
Lake Manyara National Park (part)
Mount Longido Forest Reserve
Mount Meru Forest Reserve
Ngorongoro Conservation Area
Ngurdoto Crater
Oldonyo Lengai
Olduvai Gorge
Uhuru Monument

Demographics 
According to the 2012 national census, the Arusha Region had a population of 1,694,310.

The region is inhabited by various ethnolinguistic groups and communities. Among these are the Iraqw, Arusha, Maasai, Wameru,
Sonjo, Chagga, Pare, and Nguu.

Culture and cuisine 
Nyama Choma, the northern Tanzanian barbecue, is a popular dish among some communities in the Arusha Region, particularly the Maasai. Nyama Choma is properly served with a side of french fries, Pili Pili sauce and a cold local beer or soda.

Transportation

Roads
The A-23 Arusha-Himo road runs east–west and enters the region near Kilimanjaro International Airport. It connects Arusha with Moshi and then Himo at the Kenyan border. This roads ends at its junction with the A-104 road in the center of Arusha.

The A-104 runs northward, to the west of Mount Meru, from Arusha to Longido and Namanga at the Kenyan border before continuing to Nairobi. The A-104 also runs westward past Monduli to its junction at Makuyuni with the B-144 road that leads to Mto wa Mbu and the Ngorongoro Conservation Area. After that, the A-104 curves southward to the east of Lake Manyara and continues on to Babati and Dodoma.

Most overland travel is done by bus from the city of Arusha. Within the city and smaller towns, privately owned and operated dala-dalas (mini-buses) are used.

The region is landlocked, and there are no navigable rivers. The larger lakes in the Rift Valley are not used for transportation. The region is home to Lake Eyasi, Lake Natron, Lake Duluti, Lake Empakaai, and the Momella lakes.

Airports

Arusha Region is served by the Kilimanjaro International Airport located in Hai District of Kilimanjaro Region. Its twelve international carriers are:

 Airkenya Express
 Air Uganda
 Condor
 Edelweiss Air
 Ethiopian Airlines
 Kenya Airways
 KLM
 Precision Air
 Qatar Airways
 RwandAir
 Safarilink Aviation
 Turkish Airlines

The smaller Arusha Airport (Kisongo Airport) serves small, medium and personal planes mainly to popular tourist areas such as Serengeti National Park, Seronera, Ndutu, Zanzibar etc. Planes using Kisongo Airport include:

AMREF
Auric Air
Coastal Air
Flying Doctors
Grumeti Air 
Other personal planes.
 Precision Air
 TFC

Notable persons from Arusha Region

 Filbert Bayi Tanzanian long distance runner
 Dogo Janja, Tanzanian recording artist
 Edward Lowassa Tanzania's tenth prime minister from 2005 to 2008
 Vanessa Mdee, Tanzanian recording artist
 Peter K. Palangyo, Tanzanian novelist and diplomat  
 Edward Sokoine Tanzania's second prime minister

Regional commissioners
The chief administrative officer of the region is the regional commissioner. Below is a table showing the regional commissioners serving the Arusha Region from 1962 to present:

See also

 Arusha Accords
 Arusha Airport
 Arusha Cultural Heritage Centre
 Arusha Declaration
 Geography of Tanzania
 Mguu wa Zuberi
 Selian River

References

External links

 
 Language map for Tanzania
 MS Training Centre for Development Cooperation (Danish Centre)

 
Regions of Tanzania